Tritoniella belli is a species of the nudibranch genus Tritoniella. The species was described together with its synonym Tritoniella sinuata in 1907 by the British diplomat and malacologist Charles Eliot.

Synonymy
Tritoniella sinuata was synonymized by Wägele in 1989 after she found that differentiation by the characters Eliot described was impossible. She argued, that differences between specimens were caused by fixation and individual variability.

References

Gastropods described in 1907
Tritoniidae